Robert Witherspoon (January 29, 1767October 11, 1837) was an American politician who served as a U.S. Representative from South Carolina.

Witherspoon was born near Kingstree in the Province of South Carolina as the son of a Scots-Irish father, Robert Witherspoon (1728–1778) who was born in County Down, Ireland and settled in the Province of South Carolina. His mother was Elizabeth Heathly Witherspoon (1740–1820), who was born in South Carolina. Robert Witherspoon attended local schools.

Witherspoon was elected State treasurer in 1800 and served one term. He was a member of the South Carolina House of Representatives from 1792 to 1794 from 1802 to 1804 and from 1806 to 1808.

Witherspoon was elected as a Democratic-Republican to the Eleventh Congress (March 4, 1809 – March 3, 1811). He declined to be a candidate for reelection. He had large slave planting interests in Sumter County, South Carolina. He opposed the nullification act in 1832.

He died near Mayesville, South Carolina, October 11, 1837. He was interred in the Salem Brick Church Cemetery.

He was great-great-grandfather of Robert Witherspoon Hemphill.

References

Sources

1767 births
1837 deaths
Members of the South Carolina House of Representatives
People from Williamsburg County, South Carolina
American people of Scotch-Irish descent
Democratic-Republican Party members of the United States House of Representatives from South Carolina
People from Mayesville, South Carolina